Chaparral USD 361 is a public unified school district headquartered in Anthony, Kansas, United States.  The district includes the communities of Anthony, Harper, Bluff City, Danville, Waldron, Crystal Springs, Duquoin, Freeport, Runnymede, and nearby rural areas.

Schools
The school district operates the following schools:
 Chaparral Jr/Sr High, located between Anthony and Harper
 Anthony Elementary, located in Anthony
 Harper Elementary, located in Harper

See also
 Kansas State Department of Education
 Kansas State High School Activities Association
 List of high schools in Kansas
 List of unified school districts in Kansas

References

External links
 

School districts in Kansas